Diana Petkova (born 10 June 2000) is a Bulgarian swimmer. She competed at the 2020 Summer Olympics, in Women's 100 m breaststroke, and Women's 200 m individual medley.

Life
She studied at University of Alabama. She competed in the women's 50 metre freestyle event at the 2018 FINA World Swimming Championships (25 m), in Hangzhou, China.

References

External links
 
 Alabama Crimson Tide bio

2000 births
Living people
Bulgarian female swimmers
Bulgarian female freestyle swimmers
Place of birth missing (living people)
European Games competitors for Bulgaria
Swimmers at the 2015 European Games
Swimmers at the 2018 Summer Youth Olympics
Sportspeople from Plovdiv
Swimmers at the 2020 Summer Olympics
Olympic swimmers of Bulgaria
21st-century Bulgarian women